Fordstreet or Ford Street is a village on the A1124 road, in the civil parish of Aldham in the Colchester district in Essex, England. It is located on the River Colne and is near the large town of Colchester. Artist Damon Albarn lived there as a child.

References

Villages in Essex